Danilkovo is a rural locality (a village) in Nikolskoye Rural Settlement, Kaduysky District, Vologda Oblast, Russia. The population was 10 as of 2002.

Geography 
Danilkovo is located 61 km north of Kaduy (the district's administrative centre) by road. Kumsara is the nearest rural locality.

References 

Rural localities in Kaduysky District